Holaxyra acuta is a moth in the family Gelechiidae. It was described by Edward Meyrick in 1927. It is found in South Africa.

The wingspan is about 19 mm. The forewings are whitish mixed with light grey, with the veins grey. There is a strong grey median stripe from the base to the apex, becoming dark fuscous on the upper edge, the costal area above this wholly clear white. There are three or four undefined dark fuscous or blackish terminal dots. The hindwings are pale grey.

References

Endemic moths of South Africa
Moths described in 1927
Dichomeridinae